Dicarbon monoxide (C2O) is a molecule that contains two carbon atoms and one oxygen atom. It is a linear molecule that, because of its simplicity, is of interest in a variety of areas.  It is, however, so extremely reactive that it is not encountered in everyday life.  It is classified as a cumulene and an oxocarbon.

Occurrence
Dicarbon monoxide is a product of the photolysis of carbon suboxide:

C3O2  → CO  + C2O

It is stable enough to observe reactions with NO and NO2.

Called ketenylidene in organometallic chemistry, it is a ligand observed in metal carbonyl clusters, e.g. [OC2Co3(CO)9]+.  Ketenylidenes are proposed as intermediates in the chain growth mechanism of the Fischer-Tropsch Process, which converts carbon monoxide and hydrogen to hydrocarbon fuels.

The organophosphorus compound (C6H5)3PCCO (CAS# 15596-07-3) contains the C2O functionality.  Sometimes called Bestmann's Ylide, it is a yellow solid.

References

Carbenes
Oxocarbons